"Dueling Banjos" is a bluegrass composition by Arthur "Guitar Boogie" Smith. The song was composed in 1954 by Smith as a banjo instrumental he called "Feudin' Banjos"; it contained riffs from Smith, recorded in 1955 playing a four-string plectrum banjo and accompanied by five-string bluegrass banjo player Don Reno. The composition's first wide-scale airing was on a 1963 television episode of The Andy Griffith Show called "Briscoe Declares for Aunt Bee", in which it is played by visiting musical family the Darlings (portrayed by The Dillards, a bluegrass group), along with Griffith himself.

The song was made famous by the 1972 film Deliverance, which also led to a successful lawsuit by the song's composer, as it was used in the film without Smith's permission. The film version was arranged and recorded by Eric Weissberg and Steve Mandell, but only credited to Weissberg on a single subsequently issued in December 1972. It went to #2 for four weeks on the Billboard Hot 100 in 1973, behind Roberta Flack's "Killing Me Softly with His Song"; it topped the adult contemporary chart for two weeks. It reached No. 1 for one week on both the Cashbox and Record World charts. It reached No. 5 on Hot Country Singles. It was nominated for the 30th Golden Globe Awards as Best Original Song.

Use in Deliverance
In Deliverance, a scene depicts Billy Redden playing it opposite Ronny Cox, who joins him on guitar and they end up having a guitar vs. banjo duel. Redden plays Lonnie, a mentally challenged and inbred but extremely gifted banjo player. Redden could not actually play the banjo and the director thought his hand movements looked unconvincing. A local musician, Mike Addis, was brought in to depict the movement of the boy's left hand. Addis hid behind Redden, with his left arm in Redden's shirt sleeve. Careful camera angles kept Addis out of frame and completed the illusion. The music itself was dubbed in from the recording made by Weissberg and Mandell and was not played by the actors themselves. Two young musicians, Ron Brentano and Mike Russo, had originally been signed to play their adaptation for the film, but instead it was performed by Weissberg and Mandell.

"Dueling Banjos" was arranged and performed for the film by Eric Weissberg and Steve Mandell and was included on its soundtrack. When Arthur "Boogie" Smith was not acknowledged as the composer by the filmmakers, he sued and eventually won, receiving songwriting credit as well as royalties.

The song was briefly used in a TV commercial for the 2003 Saturn Vue.

Chart performance

See also
List of number-one adult contemporary singles of 1973 (U.S.)

References

Songs about musical instruments
1955 songs
1972 singles
Eric Weissberg songs
Warner Records singles
Instrumental duets
1950s instrumentals
Cashbox number-one singles